Borowy Młyn may refer to the following places in Poland:

Borowy Młyn, Bytów County in Pomeranian Voivodeship (north Poland)
Borowy Młyn, Kwidzyń County in Pomeranian Voivodeship (north Poland)
Borowy Młyn, Kuyavian-Pomeranian Voivodeship (north-central Poland)
Borowy Młyn, Greater Poland Voivodeship (west-central Poland)
Borowy Młyn, Lubusz Voivodeship (west Poland)
Borowy Młyn, Warmian-Masurian Voivodeship (north Poland)
Borowy Młyn, Kwidzyn County in Pomeranian Voivodeship (north Poland)